Nasal  is an adjective referring to the nose, part of human or animal anatomy. It may also be shorthand for the following uses in combination:
 With reference to the human nose:
 Nasal administration, a method of pharmaceutical drug delivery
 Nasal emission, the abnormal passing of oral air through a palatal cleft, or from some other type of pharyngeal inadequacy
 Nasal hair, the hair in the nose
 With reference to phonetics:
 Nasalization, the production of a sound with a lowered velum, allowing some of the air to escape through the nose; the resulting being either:
 a nasal consonant, or
 a nasal vowel
 With reference to the nose of humans or other animals:
 Nasal bone, two small oblong bones placed side by side at the middle and upper part of the face, and form, by their junction, "the bridge" of the nose
 Nasal cavity, a large air filled space above and behind the nose in the middle of the face
 Nasal concha, a long, narrow and curled bone shelf which protrudes into the breathing passage of the nose
 Nasal scale of reptiles

Other uses 
 Nasal, the medieval term for the nose guard of a helmet, such as in a nasal helm
 Năsal, a village in Țaga Commune, Cluj County, Romania
 Nasal language, Sumatra

See also
 Nacelle, a cover housing (separate from the fuselage) that holds engines, fuel, or equipment on an aircraft
 Naso (disambiguation)